Białe Augustowskie (Polish: Jezioro Białe Augustowskie) - is a ribbon lake in Augustów. Other names: Białe Lake (White Lake) or Krechowieckie Lake.

The lake has an area of 480 ha. The lakeside is well developed with numerous bays (Orzechówka, Tartaczna, Wierszowiec) and spits (southern lakeside - Pień, Dąbek, Lisi Ogon, northern lakeside - Ostry Róg). A majority of the lakeside is high and barren, forested with creeping pine. There are four islands in the lake (with a total area of 1.5 ha).

References

Lakes of Poland
Lakes of Podlaskie Voivodeship